The  Philharmonic Society – philharmonic in the city of Rostov-on-Don.

Address: Rostov-on-Don, B. Sadovaya, 170.

History 

Until the mid-1930s, symphonic and chamber concerts in Rostov-on-Don were given by musical educational institutions and the State Radio Committee.

On March 21, 1935, according to the Decree of the Presidium of the Azov-Black Sea Executive Committee for "the establishment of musical services of the region", the Rostov State Philharmonic was established. Great contribution to the creation of the Philharmonic was made by his first leader - musicologist, teacher, Honored Artist of the RSFSR Grigory Savelievich Dombaev.

The opening of the Rostov State Philharmonic became part of the musical culture of the South of Russia. The Rostov Academic Symphony Orchestra gives concerts in its composition for about 80 years. The orchestra's repertoire includes ancient music and modern music. Over the years, the orchestra was led by conductors: Nikolay Anosov, Mark Paverman, Leonid Katz, Semyon Kogan, Ravil Martynov and others.

For the first decade, in addition to the symphony orchestra, the Song and Dance Ensemble of the « Don Cossacks» and the musical-literary lecture school were created at the beginning of the Great Patriotic War.

At the present time, musical collectives and soloists work in the Rostov Philharmonic, among them are national and honored artists of the Russian Federation, laureates and diplomats of All-Russian and international competitions. In the Rostov Philharmonic there are creative groups created in different years: the Department of Music and Literary Programs "Classic Concert", the State Concert Orchestra of Wind Instruments named after V. N. Ezhdika, the orchestra of Russian folk instruments "Don", the ensemble of Russian folk instruments "Dontsy", the variety jazz orchestra named after K. Nazarethova, show-group "Amazon".

Conservatory building 
A three-story brick house was built on in Rostov-on-Don (K. V. Charakhchants' apartment house) at the beginning of the 20th century. Balconies were arranged in the center of the building, above the front entrance and at the sides. The building was decorated with stucco, crowning cornice, pilasters, acroteria, bas-reliefs. Originally the third floor of the building was occupied by the hotel. There was also a cafe-theater "Mars", previously the theater was called "Palais de Cristal", on the first floor there were shops.

Later the cafe was leased to the "labor association of the Tatars", in which  N. Khaybegov was consisted, A. Kh. Dimakayev and K. I. Bikeyev. Conserts were given in the house every evening, there were meetings of  musicians.

In February 1917 the building became the center of revolutionary events. After the February Revolution, there was the Rostov-Nakhichevan Soviet of Workers' Deputies, and then the Military Revolutionary Committee. In November 1917, the building was occupied by the headquarters for the preparation of an armed uprising against the Don government of Ataman Kaledin, who did not recognize the October revolution, who declared Don in a martial law and banned the export of bread and coal to the central regions of Russia.

In 1927 there was a club of metal workers in the building. Since 1935 the building housed the Rostov Philharmonic.

In 1976-1978, after the reconstruction by the architects N. A. Sergeev and V. A. Korolev, the building received a modern look.

Management 
The Rostov State Philharmonic Society was headed at different times by G. S. Dombaev, I. K. Shaposhnikov, A. P. Artamonov and G. I. Bezrodny, A. M. Lukovsky, N. S. Kostarev, E. V. Agopova, B. Y. Chirvin, V. N. Epifanovsky, F. I. Ishchenko.

Currently, the Rostov State Philharmonic is headed by the General Director Oksana Ivanovna Yakovleva.

References

External links 
 Info
 Ростовская государственная филармония
 Ростовская государственная филармония

1935 establishments in Russia
Musical groups established in 1935
Russian orchestras
Rostov-on-Don